Henry Orton Wiley (11 November 1877 – 22 August 1961) was a Christian theologian primarily associated with the followers of John Wesley who are part of the Holiness movement. A member of the Church of the Nazarene, his "magnum opus" was the three volume systematic theology Christian Theology.

Early life and education
Henry Orton Wiley was born in Marquette, Nebraska on 11 November 1877. The Wiley family moved to California in April 1886, then to Oregon in 1893. H. Orton Wiley graduated from Medford High School in Oregon on May 31, 1895. In his last year of high school, Wiley was employed at a local drugstore and began the study of Pharmacy and was awarded his certificate of Pharmacy by the Oregon State Board of Pharmaceutics on March 9, 1897. He later received a diploma in Pharmacy in 1897 from the National Institute of Pharmacy in Chicago, Illinois. Wiley converted to Christianity in 1895. Wiley met his wife, Alice, while working at his father's store. They were married in 1902. Wiley decided to further his education and earned his Bachelor of Arts degree from the University of the Pacific in 1910 and also a Bachelor of Divinity from Pacific Theological Seminary the same year.

Career in education
In 1910, Wiley was elected dean of the Pacific Bible College under President Phineas F. Bresee. Wiley was asked by President Phineas F. Bresee to write the first catalogue for the college. In it, Wiley defended the role of the Christian liberal arts college, emphasizing its roles as a cultural custodian and promoter of spiritual intensity.

Later, Wiley would himself become president of Nazarene University in 1913,  but leave in 1916 to become president of the Idaho-Oregon Holiness School, which would be renamed Northwest Nazarene College under Wiley's leadership. He would leave Idaho to become president in California again in 1927 until leaving again in 1928, and was president at Pasadena one more time from 1933 to 1949.

Upon arriving at the Idaho-Oregon Holiness School, Wiley was offered a notable ten-year contract as president, during which he published the first Oasis yearbook and Nazarene Messenger, wrote a standard three-volume theological statement of the Church of the Nazarene. He “guided the school between Scylla of emotionalism and the Charybdis of formalism.” His leadership pushed the upstart institution to become a liberal arts school, a dream represented through changing the school’s name to Northwest Nazarene College.

Theology
In his book Introduction to christian theology, Wiley argues for the Arminian views of unlimited atonement, conditional election and prevenient grace in opposition to the main points of Calvinism. In Christian theology, he stresses that the prevenient grace, operates in a continuous way from "the first dawn of the moral life". This would allow a synergistic co-operation with the human will, that doesn't undermine the responsibility and the total depravity of man. Wayne Grudem considers this work to be the best Arminian systematic theology from the twentieth century, but not reaching to the level of John Miley’s. Wiley hold to the governmental theory of atonement.

Memorial/legacy
Orton died of cancer in his residence in Pasadena the 22nd August 1961. The H. Orton Wiley House is listed on the National Register of Historic Places in part for its association with Wiley.

Publications

Notes and references

Citations

Sources

Further reading

External links

1877 births
1961 deaths
American members of the Church of the Nazarene
American theologians
Arminian theologians
Methodist theologians
Nazarene theologians
Pacific School of Religion alumni
Presidents of Northwest Nazarene University
Presidents of Point Loma Nazarene University
Systematic theologians
University of the Pacific (United States) alumni